Roccaverano is a comune (municipality) in the Province of Asti in the Italian region Piedmont, located about  southeast of Turin and about  south of Asti. 

Roccaverano borders the following municipalities: Bubbio, Cessole, Denice, Loazzolo, Mombaldone, Monastero Bormida, Olmo Gentile, San Giorgio Scarampi, Serole, Spigno Monferrato, and Vesime.

References

External links
 Official website

Cities and towns in Piedmont
Articles containing video clips